Alice Thompson, or Alice Thomson may refer to:

 Alice Meynell, née Thompson (18471922), British writer, editor, critic, and suffragist, remembered mainly as a poet
 Alice Thompson (fl. 1990s–2010s), Scottish novelist
 Alice Thomson (born 1967), British political journalist